Rev. Thomas Tucker Broad (1863 – 26 January 1935), was a British Congregational Minister and Liberal Party politician.

Background
Broad was educated at New College, London and University College, London. He married Margaret Cooper in 1902.

Professional career
Broad was a member of Sheffield Board of Guardians. He was engaged during the Great War in connection with YMCA Huts.

Political career
Broad was Liberal candidate for the new Clay Cross division of Derbyshire at the 1918 General Election. He received the "coalition coupon" and there was no Unionist Party candidate opposing him. He won the seat with a majority of 8% of the votes over his Labour Party opponent. For the 1922 election, when he stood as a National Liberal, the local Liberal association not only decided to run an anti-coalition candidate against him but had attracted former Liberal cabinet minister, Charles Masterman as their candidate. Masterman polled nearly twice as many votes as Broad. With the Liberal vote split, the Labour candidate was able to take the seat. 
At the 1923 general election, with the two factions of the Liberal Party reunited, Broad stood in the Leyton East, but came third with only 28% of the votes. He did not stand for Parliament again. He wrote and published 'An All-In National Insurance Scheme. Security for all workers and their families' in 1924.

Electoral record

References

External links
 

1863 births
1935 deaths
Liberal Party (UK) MPs for English constituencies
UK MPs 1918–1922
National Liberal Party (UK, 1922) politicians